The 1900 Latrobe Athletic Association season was their sixth season in existence. The team finished 6–3.

Schedule

Game notes

References

Latrobe Athletic Association
Latrobe Athletic Association seasons